Luka Gajič (born 6 May 1996) is a Slovenian footballer who plays as a forward for Dob.

References

External links
 NZS profile 
 

1996 births
Living people
Slovenian footballers
Association football forwards
NK Olimpija Ljubljana (2005) players
NK Radomlje players
NK Krško players
NK Bravo players
NK Dob players
ND Ilirija 1911 players
Slovenian PrvaLiga players
Slovenian Second League players
Slovenia youth international footballers
Slovenia under-21 international footballers